Rich Catton (born September 1, 1971 in New Westminster, British Columbia) is a player for the Colorado Mammoth in the National Lacrosse League. In the summer he played for the Victoria Shamrocks of the Western Lacrosse Association until being traded to Coquitlam in June 2007.

Statistics

NLL

References

1971 births
Canadian lacrosse players
Living people
Colorado Mammoth players
Calgary Roughnecks players
Buffalo Bandits players
Sportspeople from British Columbia